Purpuraturris nadaensis is a species of sea snail, a marine gastropod mollusk in the family Turridae, the turrids.

Description
The length of the shell varies between 57 mm and 87 mm.

Distribution
This marine species occurs off the Philippines and Japan.

References

 Azuma, M. (1973). Three new gastropods from off the Kii Peninsula and Tosa Bay with a record of a rare carditid bivalve. Venus 32(2):33–38. 8: figs.

External links
 Chase, K., Watkins, M., Safavi-Hemami, H. & Olivera, B. M. (2022). Integrating venom peptide libraries into a phylogenetic and broader biological framework. Frontiers in Molecular Biosciences. 9: 784419

nadensis
Gastropods described in 1973